Carlos Alberto Garrido Opazo (born January 6, 1977, in Talca, Chile) is a Chilean former footballer who played as a centre-back.

Career 
He began his career playing for his hometown team Rangers in 1997. In 2001, he moved to Universidad de Chile before returning to Rangers for a season. In 2006, he moved to Audax Italiano where he was a regular with the first team, returning to Rangers in 2013. Garrido became the team captain of Audax Italiano at the beginning of 2008 when teammate Carlos Villanueva refused to the post because of a dispute he had with the team's administration.  In August 2014, he retired from football due to a thrombophilia detected in 2013. In total, he has more than 200 games in the Chilean Primera División.

Post retirement
Since December 2021, he works as Sport Director of Rangers de Talca.

Honours
Audax Italiano
  (1):

References

External links
 
 

1977 births
Living people
People from Talca
Chilean footballers
Rangers de Talca footballers
Universidad de Chile footballers
Audax Italiano footballers
Primera B de Chile players
Chilean Primera División players
Association football defenders